Hsiang Chun-Hsien (born 4 September 1993) is a Taiwanese athlete specialising in the high jump. He won the silver medal at the 2015 Asian Championships and the bronze at the 2015 Summer Universiade.

His personal bests in the event are  metres outdoors (Gwangju 2015) and  metres indoors (Hangzhou 2014). Both are current national records. It bettered his record at Kaohsiung to 2.29, on 21 October 2015.

He studied at the National Taiwan University of Physical Education and Sport.

Competition record

1No mark in the final

References

1993 births
Living people
Taiwanese male high jumpers
Athletes (track and field) at the 2010 Asian Games
Athletes (track and field) at the 2014 Asian Games
Athletes (track and field) at the 2018 Asian Games
Athletes (track and field) at the 2010 Summer Youth Olympics
World Athletics Championships athletes for Chinese Taipei
Athletes (track and field) at the 2016 Summer Olympics
Olympic athletes of Taiwan
Universiade medalists in athletics (track and field)
Universiade bronze medalists for Chinese Taipei
Asian Games competitors for Chinese Taipei
Medalists at the 2015 Summer Universiade
Medalists at the 2017 Summer Universiade